Shaun Williamson (born 29 November 1965) is an English actor best known as Barry Evans in EastEnders and as a satirical version of himself in the BBC/HBO sitcom Extras, 'Barry off EastEnders'.

Early life
Williamson was born in Park Wood, Maidstone. He attended Holy Family RC Primary School, followed by St Simon Stock Catholic School where he frequently played truant. Following school he became a postman, but developed a drink problem, consuming 12 pints of beer a day by the time he was 18. He later said he joined the Royal Navy at that point "to break that cycle". He completed his training at HMS Raleigh. He intended to become a helicopter pilot but was rejected when it was discovered he was colour blind. He subsequently worked in various jobs such as a Bluecoat for Pontins, as a rep for Club 18-30 and one season at Camp America. Aged 26 he was working for Safeway when he decided to enlist at the Webber Douglas Academy of Dramatic Art.

Career

Television
Williamson is widely known for his portrayal of the foolish, hapless Barry Evans in the BBC soap opera EastEnders, a role that he played from 1994 to 2004. This was Williamson's second role in the soap; he previously had a brief role as a paramedic earlier in 1994.  In 2009, he stated that he had no regrets about leaving the show.

Williamson was the subject of This Is Your Life in 2001. In 2004, Williamson appeared on and won an episode of Celebrity Stars in Their Eyes, impersonating the singer Meat Loaf. Williamson finished third in the 2007 series of Comic Relief does Fame Academy.  Other television roles have included parts in the detective series Inspector Morse, the ITV drama London's Burning, the BBC sitcom Waiting for God, the Ricky Gervais and Stephen Merchant comedy Extras as a send-up of himself and as Balbus, a midlife crisis afflicted Roman charioteering instructor in historical comedy series Plebs

Williamson competed in Celebrity Big Brother 20, and became the eighth housemate to be evicted, on day 23. Most recently, in 2020, Williamson appeared as recurring character Chris Smith, future father-in-law to the titular character played by Spencer Jones in the BBC Two sitcom, Mister Winner. He reprised the role from the pilot which had previously been broadcast in 2017 on BBC One.

Stage
Stage roles have included Monty the DJ in the West End run and UK tour of Saturday Night Fever, and appearing at Canterbury's Marlowe Theatre from December 2003 to January 2004 in a pantomime production of Snow White and the Seven Dwarfs, alongside Toyah Willcox. In 2006 he starred in the pantomime Dick Whittington at The Playhouse in Weston-super-Mare. He returned to the Marlowe Theatre from December 2007 to January 2008, in Aladdin, alongside Stephen Mulhern. During 2008 he played Nathan Detroit in the touring production of Guys and Dolls, having already appeared in the part in the West End. In 2008–2009, he was again appearing in Aladdin, this time at the Wyvern Theatre, Swindon. In May 2006, Williamson played the lead in the play Road to Nirvana at The King's Head Theatre London and in October 2006, appeared in a sketch as part of the charity benefit The Secret Policeman's Ball which was staged at the Royal Albert Hall.

In 2009, Williamson toured the UK playing habitual criminal Norman Stanley Fletcher in a stage version of the classic TV comedy Porridge. The script had been newly written by the series' co-authors, Dick Clement and Ian La Frenais. In 2012 he toured in The Ladykillers. He played Baron Bomburst and Lord Scrumptious in the UK tour production of Chitty Chitty Bang Bang.

Radio

In 2018, Williamson wrote a BBC radio drama series titled Eden's End, set in the Kent hop picking season of 1939. The series starred Shane Taylor (Band of Brothers), Steve Nallon (Spitting Image) and Candis Nergaard (Call the Midwife).

Quizzing
Williamson spent a year competing in the UK Quiz Grand Prix as research for his book A Matter Of Facts which details the world of elite general knowledge quizzing competitions. During this time he became a Top 50 ranked player in the UK. During an appearance on ITV's Beat The Chasers (in which he won £120,000 for The Paul Strank Charitable Trust based in south London), the Dark Destroyer described him as "celebrity quizzing royalty".

Personal life
Williamson has three children and has been married twice. His first child was born in 1987 when Williamson was 22. The child's mother was a circus performer with whom Williamson was in a relationship. After breaking up she told Williamson of her pregnancy but Williamson left to pursue a career in America, promising to care for the child on his return. When he returned the circus performer had married another man, and this man was listed as the child's father on the birth certificate. Williamson subsequently married his manager Melanie Sacre, and they were married for 16 years. They have two children together. He married Adele, his second wife, in 2018.

Filmography

Television

Film

Music video

References

External links

Shaun Williamson interview
Shauny's show The Observer interview
British Comedy Guide interview
 Filming This is Jayde article in The Citizen 

1965 births
20th-century English male actors
21st-century English male actors
20th-century Royal Navy personnel
Alumni of the Webber Douglas Academy of Dramatic Art
English male soap opera actors
English male stage actors
Male actors from Kent
Living people
People educated at Maidstone Grammar School
People from Maidstone